Storebro is a locality situated in Vimmerby Municipality, Kalmar County, Sweden with 972 inhabitants in 2010.

Internationally it is best known for being the home of yacht maker .

References

External links 

Populated places in Kalmar County
Populated places in Vimmerby Municipality